Marc Madiot (born 16 April 1959) is a French former professional road racing cyclist and double winner of Paris–Roubaix. He also competed in the individual road race event at the 1980 Summer Olympics. He is also known as the president of the French Ligue National de Cyclisme (LNC).
In  1987, he made disparaging remarks about the sport of women's cycling, calling it ugly and unesthetic.

In 2008, he was made a knight of the French Legion of Honor. It was presented by president Nicolas Sarkozy at the Elysée palace in Paris.

He is the older brother of fellow retired racing cyclist and French national road racing champion Yvon Madiot.

Major results

1979
 1st Overall Boucles de la Mayenne
1st Stage 2
 1st Paris–Roubaix Espoirs
 2nd Manche Atlantique
1980
 1st Troyes–Dijon
 Sealink International
1st Stages 1 & 2
 9th Olympic Games, Road Race
1981
 1st Overall Tour du Limousin
1st Stage 1
 2nd Overall Tour du Tarn
 2nd Overall Route du Sud
 3rd Overall Tour de Picardie
 3rd Tour de Vendée
 3rd Overall Paris–Bourges
 4th Grand Prix de Mauléon-Moulins
 8th Overall Four Days of Dunkirk
 10th GP Ouest France
 10th Overall Étoile de Bessèges
1982
 1st  National Cyclo-cross Championships
 1st Stage 1 (TTT) Giro d'Italia
 2nd Overall Tour du Limousin
 2nd Overall Paris–Bourges
 2nd Boucles de l'Aulne
 3rd Omloop der Vlaamse Ardennen Ichtegem
 3rd Côte Normande
 10th GP de la Ville de Rennes
1983
 1st Polynormande
 1st Saint-Martin de Landelles
 2nd GP Ouest France
 2nd Overall Paris–Bourges
 3rd Overall Étoile des Espoirs
 3rd National Cyclo-cross Championships
 3rd Overall Giro di Sardegna
1st Stage 4
 4th Overall Tour du Vaucluse
 5th Paris–Roubaix
 8th Overall Tour de France
 9th Overall Tour du Limousin
1984
 1st Stages 2 & 3 (TTT) Tour de France
 1st Trophée des Grimpeurs
 1st Polymultipliée
 1st Flèche Finistérienne
 1st Boucles de l'Aulne
 1st Stage 5 Tirreno–Adriatico
 1st Circuit de l'Aulne/GP Le Télégramme à Châteaulin
 1st Stage 3 Tour de l'Aude
 2nd Overall Tour du Limousin
 3rd National Cyclo-cross Championships
 4th Kuurne–Brussels–Kuurne
 6th Liège–Bastogne–Liège
 10th Milan–San Remo
1985
 1st Paris–Roubaix
 1st Grand Prix de Mauléon-Moulins
 1st Grand Prix de Plumelec-Morbihan
 1st Stage 2 Paris–Nice
 1st Grand Prix de Wallonie
 1st Chateau-Chinon
 2nd National Cyclo-cross Championships
 2nd Boucles de l'Aulne
 2nd Grand Prix Cerami
 3rd GP Ouest France
 3rd Polynormande
 4th Road race, UCI Road World Championships
 6th Paris–Camembert
 8th Overall Tour de l'Aude
1986
 2nd Tour du Haut Var
1987
 1st  Road race, National Road Championships
 1st  Overall Tour de l'Avenir
 1st Polynormande
 2nd National Cyclo-cross Championships
 3rd Giro di Lombardia
 3rd Overall Grand Prix du Midi Libre
 5th Grand Prix des Nations
 7th Liège–Bastogne–Liège
1988
 2nd Road race, National Road Championships
 5th Overall Setmana Catalana de Ciclisme
 7th Grand Prix des Amériques
 9th Overall Tour de Romandie
1989
 3rd Overall Paris–Nice
 3rd GP de la Ville de Rennes
 5th La Flèche Wallonne
 6th Paris–Roubaix
 6th Overall Grand Prix du Midi Libre
 7th Overall Critérium International
1st Stage 1
 7th Amstel Gold Race
 8th Züri-Metzgete
 8th Grand Prix des Amériques
 9th Paris–Camembert
1990
 1st Dijon, Cyclo-cross
 7th Giro dell'Emilia
1991
 1st Paris–Roubaix
 6th Tour of Flanders
 7th Wincanton Classic
 7th Rund um den Henninger Turm
 9th GP Ouest France
 10th Grand Prix des Amériques
1992
 1st Trophée des Grimpeurs
 6th Züri-Metzgete
 6th Paris–Camembert
 7th Overall Four Days of Dunkirk
1st Stage 4b
 7th Tour of Flanders
 8th GP Ouest France
1993
 2nd Bordeaux–Caudéran

Grand Tour general classification results timeline

References

External links 

  

 
 Official Tour de France results for Marc Madiot
 Cycling Hall of Fame

1959 births
Living people
Sportspeople from Mayenne
French male cyclists
French Tour de France stage winners
Olympic cyclists of France
Cyclists at the 1980 Summer Olympics
Directeur sportifs
Groupama–FDJ
Cyclists from Pays de la Loire